Kalaske is a small town situated in Teh Wazirabadon on the Alipur Chatha road about 15 kilometres (9.3 mi) west of the Gujranwala City, Punjab, Pakistan  and about 90 kilometres (56 mi) NW of the provincial capital Lahore. It has a population of approximately 35,000.

References

Villages in Gujranwala District